René Hooghiemster (born 30 July 1986) is a Dutch former professional cyclist, who rode professionally in 2007 and from 2011 to 2020 for the Löwik Meubelen,  and  teams.

Major results
2011
 1st Stage 1 Tour du Loir-et-Cher
 2nd Arno Wallaard Memorial
2013
 8th Overall Tour du Loir-et-Cher
2018
 5th GP Horsens

References

External links

1986 births
Living people
Dutch male cyclists
People from Tytsjerksteradiel
Cyclists from Friesland
21st-century Dutch people